The 2019 NCAA Division I Tennis Championships were men's and women's tennis tournaments played concurrently from May 3 to May 25, 2019, at campus sites and at the USTA National Campus in Orlando, Florida. The events marked the 74th edition of the NCAA Division I Men's Tennis Championship and the 38th edition of the NCAA Division I Women's Tennis Championship.

The University of Texas won its first men's tennis national title with a 4–1 victory in the final over Wake Forest, the defending champion. Stanford University captured its record 20th women's tennis championship, shutting out top seed Georgia.

Paul Jubb of South Carolina and Estela Pérez-Somarriba of Miami (Florida) were crowned men's and women's singles champions. UCLA won both the men's and women's doubles titles - Maxime Cressy and Keegan Smith in the men's, and Gabby Andrews and Ayan Broomfield in the women's. It was the first time since 1988 that a school swept the NCAA doubles championships.

Men's Team Championship

National seeds

1.  Ohio State (quarterfinals)
2.  Texas (National Champions) 
3.  Florida (semifinals)
4.  Wake Forest (finalists)

5.  Virginia (quarterfinals)
6.  Baylor (quarterfinals)
7.  Mississippi State (third round)
8.  USC (third round) 

9.  North Carolina (semifinals)
10.  TCU (quarterfinals)
11.  UCLA  (third round)
12.  Stanford (third round)

13.  Texas A&M (second round)
14.  Tennessee (third round)
15.  Illinois (second round)
16.  Columbia (third round)

Bracket

Women's Team Championship

National seeds

1.  Georgia (finalists)
2.  North Carolina (semifinals)
3.  Stanford (National Champions) 
4.  South Carolina (quarterfinals)

5.  Duke (semifinals)
6.  Pepperdine (quarterfinals)
7.  UCLA (quarterfinals)
8.  Vanderbilt (quarterfinals) 

9.  Texas (second round)
10.  Washington (third round)
11.  Florida State  (second round)
12.  NC State (third round)

13.  USC (third round)
14.  Kansas (third round)
15.  Oklahoma State (third round)
16.  Michigan (third round)

Bracket

Men's Singles Championship 
Entering the championship, Nuno Borges of Mississippi State had not lost a single match throughout the spring season, with a perfect 25–0 record at the No. 1 singles position. The senior advanced to the final without dropping a set.

South Carolina's Paul Jubb, seeded fourth, upset top-seeded Borges in the championship, 6–3, 7–6. Borges had defeated Jubb twice in the regular season. Jubb became the first national collegiate tennis champion representing South Carolina, and the first British man to win the NCAA men's singles championship.

National seeds

  Nuno Borges, Mississippi State
  J. J. Wolf, Ohio State
  Alex Rybakov, TCU
  Paul Jubb, South Carolina (National Champion) 
  Brandon Holt, USC
  Christian Sigsgaard, Texas
  Aleksandar Kovacevic, Illinois
  Oliver Crawford, Florida

Players ranked 9th–16th, listed by last name
  Alberto Barroso-Campos, South Florida
  William Blumberg, North Carolina
  Maxime Cressy, UCLA
  Yuya Ito, Texas
  Nicolas Moreno de Alboran, UC Santa Barbara
 Johannes Schretter, Baylor

Notes

Draw

Finals

Section 1

Section 2

Section 3

Section 4

Women's Singles Championship 
The women's singles tournament got off to an auspicious start with the third, fourth, and fifth seeds all losing in the first round. The quarterfinals featured six unseeded players, two of which - Duke's Kelly Chen and North Carolina's Cameron Morra (only a freshman at the time) - reached the semifinals. Three of the four semifinalists represented ACC schools.

Estela Pérez-Somarriba of Miami, the nation's top-ranked player entering the tournament, dropped only two sets (including the first set in the championship) en route to winning the title. She became the second Miami woman to be crowned national champion, after Audra Cohen in 2007. Finalist Katarina Jokic was the fifth woman from Georgia to reach the NCAA final and first since 2010.

Seeds 

  Estela Perez-Somarriba, Miami (FL) (National Champion) 
  Katarina Jokic, Georgia
  Kate Fahey, Michigan
  Ingrid Gamarra Martins, South Carolina
  Makenna Jones, North Carolina
  Fernanda Contreras, Vanderbilt
  Alexa Graham, North Carolina
  Sophie Whittle, Gonzaga
Players ranked 9th–16th, listed by last name
  Paige Cline, South Carolina
  Marta Gonzalez, Georgia
  Gabriela Knutson, Syracuse
  Maria Mateas, Duke
  Eden Richardson, LSU
  Anna Rogers, NC State
  Christina Rosca, Vanderbilt
  Anastasia Rychagova, Kansas

Notes

Draw

Finals

Section 1

Section 2

Section 3

Section 4

Men's Doubles Championship

Seeds 

  Jimmy Bendeck / Sven Lah, Baylor
 Maxime Cressy / Keegan Smith, UCLA (National Champions) 
 Nuno Borges / Strahinja Rakic, Mississippi State
 Oli Nolan / Henry Patten, UNC Asheville
Players ranked 5th–8th, listed by institution
  Timo Stodder / Preston Touliatos, Tennessee
 Harrison Scott / Christian Sigsgaard, Texas
 Juan Aguilar / Barnaby Smith, Texas A&M
 Cameron Klinger / Billy Rowe, Vanderbilt

Draw

Finals

Top half

Bottom half

Women's Doubles Championship

Seeds 

 Angela Kulikov / Rianna Valdes, USC
 Jessie Aney / Alexa Graham, North Carolina
 Gabby Andrews / Ayan Broomfield, UCLA (National Champions)
 Ingrid Gamarra Martins / Mia Horvit, South Carolina

Players ranked 5th–8th, listed by institution
 Nina Khmelnitckaia / Janet Koch, Kansas
 Anna Rogers / Alana Smith, NC State
 Makenna Jones / Cameron Morra, North Carolina
 Sadie Hammond / Kaitlin Staines, Tennessee

Draw

Finals

Top half

Bottom half

Notes

References 

NCAA Division I tennis championships
2019 in American tennis